2018 Kazakhstan Super Cup was a Kazakhstan football match that was played on 4 March 2018 between the champions of 2017 Kazakhstan Premier League, Astana, and the winner of the 2017 Kazakhstan Cup, Kairat.

Match details

See also
2017 Kazakhstan Premier League
2017 Kazakhstan Cup

References

FC Astana matches
FC Kairat matches
2018
Supercup